Laura is an unincorporated community in Jasper County, Indiana, in the United States.

History
Laura was established ca. 1897. A post office opened in Laura in 1902, and remained in operation until it was discontinued in 1913.

References

Unincorporated communities in Jasper County, Indiana
Unincorporated communities in Indiana